The Scilly Isles is a double roundabout in Hinchley Wood, Surrey, between the English towns of Esher and Kingston upon Thames on the traditional route of the Portsmouth Road. The name is a corruption of "silly islands", a nickname given to the road system when it was built in the 1930s.

History and notability
Since the 19th century there has been a large pub at the junction, named after a prominent aristocrat-soldier the Marquis of Granby. The junction acquired its name during the 1930s when the then new Kingston by-pass road rejoined the original route of the Portsmouth Road that was then the equivalent to today's A3. The present road is termed the A307 and the A309 crosses this and links via a dualled section to the A3 road and the north. A series of roundabouts were built at the busy (for the 1930s) intersection, then called "traffic islands". The unfamiliar nature of the double roundabout caused it to be called the "silly islands", which became locally accepted as its name, but this soon evolved into the "Scilly Isles", copying the name of the islands to the west of Cornwall. This name, although intended to be disapproving, thus became an official name, visible on all approaches to the junction and the highest definition maps.

The complexity of the junction combined with traffic greater than the planners envisaged has periodically created tension between those who wish to replace it with a more conventional layout and those who consider it to be a landmark or to reduce speeding in an ingenious way. There are relatively frequent accidents at the junction due to a small minority of users not reading the road markings or signs along its course - the northern approach is Hampton Court Way that leads to Hampton Court Palace, which adds to such users. The Esher side, being the closer town, has far more priority than the Kingston side (the small roundabout must give way to the bigger, and the latter is to the west).

The nearby Sandown Park Racecourse hosts the annual Scilly Isles Novices' Chase.  Littleworth Common and Ditton Marsh to either side are almost undeveloped commons, mostly covered by trees and grass/scrub respectively.

Position

The Scilly Isles is located in the north-western proximity of the suburb of Hinchley Wood, which is signposted on the approaches to the junction. This area is in the north of the borough of Elmbridge,  Surrey, around 2 miles from the Greater London boundary. 

See also 
Isles of Scilly
The Centre, Bristol
Notable UK road junctions

References

External links 

Transport in Surrey
Roundabouts in England